Killer Toon is a 2013 South Korean satirical psychological horror thriller film directed by Kim Yong-gyun, and starring Lee Si-young and Um Ki-joon.

The film was successful at the box office, as it was the first South Korean horror film to sell more than one million cinema tickets since Death Bell in 2008.

Plot
A popular horror webtoon artist Kang Ji-yoon (Lee Si-young) finds life imitating her own work when her publisher turns up dead in a gruesome way, precisely mirrors the images in her latest comic. After a series of murders are connected to her webtoon, a private detective Lee Ki-cheol (Um Ki-joon) places Ji-Yoon on the list of suspects.

Cast
Lee Si-young as Kang Ji-yoon
Um Ki-joon as Lee Ki-cheol 
Hyun Woo as Kim Young-soo
Moon Ga-young as Jo Seo-hyun
Kwon Hae-hyo as Jo Seon-gi
Kim Do-young as Seo Mi-sook
Kim Hae-eun as Detective Yeo
Kim So-yeon as Mi-jin
Oh Yoon-hong as Seon-gi's wife
Lee Do-yeob as coroner
Kim Ji-young as young Seo-hyun
Oh Kwang-rok as chief detective
Kim So-hyun as young Mi-sook 
Lee Yong-nyeo as female doctor Jin-kyung
Seo Jin-won as editor-in-chief
Lee Sang-hoon as internet reporter 1

Release
Killer Toon was released in South Korea on June 27, 2013, and was financially successful on its release. By July 15, 2013, the film grossed . The film debuted at second place in the South Korean box office, only being beaten by the Hollywood film World War Z.

References

External links
  
 
 
 

2013 films
2013 horror films
CJ Entertainment films
South Korean horror films
Films about comics
2010s South Korean films